Lizzie Williams (born 15 August 1983) is an Australian former racing cyclist, who rode professionally between 2014 and 2018 for the Specialized Securitor,  and teams.

Career
Williams originally quit the sport in 2004 and returned ten years later at the end of 2013, spending the time before her comeback as a teacher whilst playing Australian rules football. In a gap in the 2014 NRS calendar, Williams was a guest rider in the USA with Jono Coulter-managed team Vanderkitten for a couple of months. Coulter suggested she apply for the Amy Gillett Cycling Scholarship, she was awarded the 2014 scholarship to race with the Australian National team in Europe the next month. She rode at the 2014 UCI Road World Championships.

Williams would be offered a contract with Australian UCI Women's Team  for 2015, achieving her first UCI win that year. With the pressure of an Olympic year in 2016, an injury plagued spring classics season proved to be the breaking point for Williams and she left the Australian base in Europe unannounced. Williams reconnected with Jono Coulter to ride for his co-managed US-based UCI team  in 2017. In between the 2017 and 2018 road seasons, Williams would not return to racing with Tibco, citing the isolation from family of athlete life overseas, choosing to retire to preserve her mental health.

Major results

2003
 1st  Criterium, National Road Championships
2014
 4th Overall Trophée d'Or Féminin
 6th Philadelphia Cycling Classic
 7th Overall La Route de France
 8th Road race, Oceania Road Championships
2015
 1st SwissEver GP Cham-Hagendorn
 2nd  Road race, Oceania Road Championships
 3rd Overall Bay Classic Series
 5th Cadel Evans Great Ocean Road Race
 5th Giro del Trentino Alto Adige-Südtirol
 8th Overall Festival Luxembourgeois du cyclisme féminin Elsy Jacobs
 9th Overall Women's Tour Down Under
 9th Overall Ladies Tour of Norway
 9th Sparkassen Giro
2016
 2nd Criterium, National Road Championships
 6th Overall Women's Tour Down Under
1st Stage 3
2017
 4th Winston-Salem Cycling Classic

References

External links
 
 

1983 births
Living people
Australian female cyclists
Cyclists from Victoria (Australia)